The 3rd Asian Table Tennis Championships 1976 were held in Pyongyang, North Korea, from 26 April to 7 May 1976. It was organised by the Table Tennis Association of the Democratic People's Republic of Korea under the authority of Asian Table Tennis Union (ATTU) and International Table Tennis Federation (ITTF).

Medal summary

Medal table

Events

See also
World Table Tennis Championships
Asian Cup

References

Asian Table Tennis Championships
Asian Table Tennis Championships
Table Tennis Championships
Table tennis competitions in North Korea
Asian Table Tennis Championships 
April 1976 sports events in Asia 
May 1976 sports events in Asia